Dame Dela Smith DBE DL  (born 10 October 1952) is a retired British schoolteacher and educator. She was Headteacher at Beaumont Hill Technology College, Darlington, from 1992 until she retired in 2010, after 35 years in the field of education. Beaumont Hill is Darlington's only special school and has the full range of pupils with special educational needs including emotional behavioural difficulties.

Smith has had extensive experience at a national level and is a regular speaker at conferences. She is currently a member of the Special Educational Needs Working group and was on the working group producing a report on the future role of special schools. She is also a strategic Board member of the new NCSL North East affiliated centre. She is chair of the Association of Special School Heads for Tees Valley and Darlington.

Beaumont Hill in Darlington, County Durham caters for children aged five to 19 with a range of special needs. With another local school, Abbey Hill, it formed one of the first successful special schools bids to achieve technology college status, and it helps other mainstream schools in the area to include pupils with special educational needs. 

Smith's husband, Colin Smith, also taught in special needs education, as well as playing League football for Darlington.

Damehood
"I'm still reeling", she said in 2001 when she was created a Dame Commander of the Order of the British Empire (DBE). '"I feel absolutely stunned, and very humbled as well because it's such a tremendous honour."''

References

1952 births
Living people
Dames Commander of the Order of the British Empire
Deputy Lieutenants of Durham
People from Darlington
Schoolteachers from County Durham
Women school principals and headteachers